Annie Doris "Dolly" Walker-Wraight (24 April 1920 in Java – 15 February 2002) was a British school teacher and writer, notable for her support of Marlovian theory, the view that Christopher Marlowe was the true author of William Shakespeare's works.

Life
She married Robert Wraight in 1940 (they divorced in 1963). She earned the Froebel Teachers Diploma in 1958 and worked as a teacher at Dulwich College Preparatory School 
(1961–1967; 1975–1983) and at the William Tyndale Junior School in Islington, London, (1969–1974). She played a significant role at the start of the educational scandal at the William Tyndale, which culminated in a formal public enquiry in 1975.

Her interest in Marlowe began in 1955 when the American writer Calvin Hoffman, who popularized the Marlovian theory, published his book The man who was Shakespeare. She joined the newly formed Marlowe Society and began a drama branch to revive the rarely performed plays of Marlowe and his contemporaries. She served variously as the Society's secretary, editor of its newsletter, Vice-Chair and Chair. In 1965, as "A. D. Wraight", she published an illustrated biography: In Search of Christopher Marlowe (in collaboration with the American photographer, Virginia Stern).

Dolly Walker-Wraight's research into the Marlovian theory centred on an interpretation of Shakespeare's sonnets in the light of it, and in 1994 her first book openly espousing the theory was published.

She died on 15 February 2002, aged 81.

The Shakespeare Sonnets

The methodology in  her book "The Story that the Sonnets Tell" was to  divide the sonnets of Shakespeare into different categories according to their meaning, to come closer to the solution  of their mystery. She approached the problem  by assuming that what the poet himself wrote is as close to the truth as one can get. According to her belief, the basic mistake committed by many interpreters of the Sonnets was that they have assumed that there is only a single young man (the "Fair Youth") to whom most of the sonnets are addressed. She claims to have identified at least three.

The first one is Henry Wriothesley, 3rd Earl of Southampton, whose seventeenth birthday the first seventeen sonnets were commissioned by Lord Burghley to commemorate. Their intent was to inspire him to marry Burghley's granddaughter.

The second young man of the Sonnets is a certain "William Hatcliffe", one of the several candidates to be the Mr. W.H. of the dedication. In this identification, she follows the arguments of Leslie Hotson.

The third man is Thomas Walsingham, Marlowe's  friend, who stood by him as he was unjustly dishonoured and forced into exile, for which constancy the poet was indebted to him for the rest of his life, and which the sonnets might illustrate.

According to Walker-Wraight, the order of the sonnets in the original 1609 edition probably was arranged by the poet himself, adopting a form like a five-act play. She believes that the poet himself could never have envisaged that his sonnets would be rearranged in the pattern she devised.

Publications 
 In Search of Christopher Marlowe (1965)
 The Real Christopher Marlowe, an open letter to Charles Nicholl (1992)
 Christopher Marlowe and Edward Alleyn (1993)
 The Story that the Sonnets Tell (1994)
 Shakespeare: New Evidence (1996)

References

External links
PBS.org
Marlowe Society website

1920 births
2002 deaths
Schoolteachers from London
Marlovian theory of Shakespeare authorship
Place of death missing
Shakespeare authorship theorists
20th-century British translators
British expatriates in the Dutch East Indies